OSAF is the Open Source Applications Foundation.

OSAF may also refer to:
 The OSA Foundation of the Optical Society of America
 Old Students Association of FAST-NU at the National University of Computer and Emerging Sciences in Pakistan
 Oberster Sturmabteilung Führer (Supreme Commander of the SA) during the Third Reich